Yuquan may refer to:

Places in China
Yuquan District, a district in Hohhot, Inner Mongolia
Jade Spring Hill, or Yuquan Hill, a hill in Summer Palace, Beijing
Yuquan Campus, Zhejiang University, a campus of Zhejiang University in Hangzhou, Zhejiang

Towns
Yuquan, Chongqing (鱼泉), in Yunyang County, Chongqing
Yuquan, Jiayuguan (峪泉), Gansu
Yuquan, Tianshui (玉泉), Gansu
Yuquan, Shanxi (玉泉), in Tianzhen County, Shanxi
Yuquan, Mianzhu (玉泉), Sichuan

Subdistricts
Yuquan Subdistrict, Meitan County (鱼泉街道), Guizhou
Yuquan Subdistrict, Harbin (玉泉街道), Heilongjiang
Yuquan Subdistrict, Jiyuan (玉泉街道), Henan
Yuquan Subdistrict, Dangyang (玉泉街道), Hubei
Yuquan Subdistrict, Panzhihua (玉泉街道), Sichuan

Other
Yuquan Shenxiu (606–706), Chinese Chan Buddhist master
Yu Quan, Chinese soft-rock duet

See also
Yuquan Temple (disambiguation)